Beta Leporis (β Leporis, abbreviated Beta Lep, β Lep), formally named Nihal , is the second brightest star in the constellation of Lepus.

Nomenclature

Beta Leporis is the star's Bayer designation. It is also known by the traditional named Nihal, Arabic for "quenching their thirst". The occasional spelling Nibal appears to be due to a misreading. In 2016, the International Astronomical Union organized a Working Group on Star Names (WGSN) to catalog and standardize proper names for stars. The WGSN's first bulletin of July 2016 included a table of the first two batches of names approved by the WGSN; which included Nihal for this star.

Properties 

It has an apparent visual magnitude of 2.84 and a stellar classification of G5 II. The mass of this star is 3.5 times the mass of the Sun and it is about 240 million years old, which is sufficient time for a star this massive to consume the hydrogen at its core and evolve away from the main sequence, becoming a G-type bright giant.

This is a double star system and may be a binary, whereby the second star has a brightness of 7.34 mag . Using adaptive optics on the AEOS telescope at Haleakala Observatory, the pair was found to be separated by an angle of 2.58 arcseconds at a position angle of 1.4°. Component B has been observed to fluctuate in brightness and is catalogued as suspected variable star NSV 2008.

References

Nihal
Lepus (constellation)
G-type bright giants
5
Leporis, Beta
Leporis, 09
036079
025606
BD-20 1096
1829